The Finnish national road 13 (Finnish: Valtatie 13, Swedish: Riksväg 13) is a highway in Finland. The highway connects the communities of Kokkola and Lappeenranta via Jyväskylä.

Roads in Finland
Transport in Jyväskylä